Players' ages as of the tournament's opening day (8 August 2014).

Group A

Angola
Head coach:  Manuel Silva

Greece
Head coach:  Dimitrios Papanikolaou

Philippines
Head coach:  Michael Ray Jarin

United States
Head coach:  Don Showalter

Group B

Australia
Head coach:

Canada
Head coach:

France
Head coach:

Japan
Head coach:

Group C

Italy
Head coach:
F Luigi Papa

Puerto Rico
Head coach:

Spain
Head coach:

United Arab Emirates
Head coach:

Group D

Argentina
Head coach:

China
Head coach:

Egypt
Head coach:

Serbia
Head coach:

References
Official site

Squads
FIBA